Kao u snu – EKV Live 1991 is the third live album by Serbian rock band Ekatarina Velika, released in 2001. It was recorded at the band's concert held on December 13, 1991 in Dom omladine" in Belgrade, which was a part of the Dum Dum album promotional tour.

Track listing
(music by Ekatarina Velika, except: 1,2,4,5,6,7,11,12 - by Milan Mladenović, arrangements by Ekatarina Velika, lyrics by Milan Mladenović except where noted)

"Odgovor" - 5:05
"Siguran" - 5:49
"Kao da je bilo nekad" - 5:23
"Karavan" - 3:54
"Dolce vita"  - 4:22
"Idemo" - 4:03
"Glad" - 3:51
"Oči boje meda" - 4:32
"Zemlja" (lyrics: M. Mladenović, M. Stefanović) - 4:26
"Krug" - 3:16
"Zabranjujem" - 6:08
"Bledo" - 5:10
"Budi sam na ulici"  - 5:18
"Ti si sav moj bol" - 5:51
"Ljudi iz gradova" - 5:37
"Novac u rukama" - 4:04

Personnel

Milan Mladenović - vocals, guitar
Margita Stefanović - keyboards
Marko Milivojević - drums
Dragiša "Ćima" Uskoković - bass
Tanja Jovićević - backing vocals

Additional personnel

Srđan "Žika" Todorović - drums (10)
Neša Petrović - saxophone (2,3)
Goran "Čavke" Čavajda - rgyagling (12)

External links

Ekatarina Velika albums
2001 live albums